California's 47th district may refer to:

 California's 47th congressional district
 California's 47th State Assembly district